Jean-Pierre Marty (born 12 October 1932) is a French pianist and conductor.

Jean-Pierre Marty was first a pupil of Alfred Cortot, then of Julius Katchen. He started a piano career at the age of 13, first serving as accompanist to the cellist Pierre Fournier for a few months before appearing in Paris as soloist in three piano concertos. He also studied harmony, counterpoint and composition with Nadia Boulanger whom he eventually succeeded as Director of the American Conservatory in Fontainebleau. He pursued his pianistic career in France, Spain, the Netherlands and Germany until it was interrupted by serious muscular problems at the age of 20.

Having moved to the United States, he shifted to conducting, taking lessons from Robert Irving and Thomas Schippers and appearing first in ballet (New York City Ballet, American Ballet Theater), then in opera (New York City Opera, Washington Opera). On his return to France, he was for seven years Music Director of the Opera Season of the French Radio while pursuing his career both in the operatic and  symphonic fields in Europe and in the Americas. He realized many recordings for EMI, France and the French Radio label (his recording of Poulenc's  with Régine Crespin was particularly acclaimed).

His interest in the piano had never ceased, and he kept giving piano concerts. His recordings of the piano works of Schumann from Opp. 1 to 32 (8 CDs) have been published, receiving a warm reception.

Jean-Pierre Marty is the author of three books: The tempo indications of Mozart, written in English and published by Yale University Press both in the United States and the United Kingdom and, in French, Twenty-four lessons with Chopin and The piano method of Chopin.

Selected discography
 Brahms - Hungarian Dances, Book II, original version for piano 4-hands, with Julius Katchen
 1968 - Louis Ganne - Les saltimbanques - EMI
 1970 - Offenbach - La belle Hélène - EMI
 1974 - Rossini - The Barber of Seville - EMI
 1974 - Auber - Manon Lescaut - EMI

Sources 

 , Alain Pâris, (Éditions Robert Laffont, 1989) 

1932 births
French male conductors (music)
20th-century French male classical pianists
Living people
21st-century French conductors (music)
21st-century French male classical pianists
20th-century French conductors (music)